The Copa de la Reina de Baloncesto (English: Queen's Cup of Basketball) is an annual cup competition for Spanish women's basketball teams. The first edition of the competition, originally named Women's Senior Basketball Championship, took place in 1943, which makes it the oldest Spanish women's basketball competition, but it was only since 1978, when it took its current name, that it has been carried every year. The 2012 cup marked the 50th edition of the competition.

The cup is played by the top teams of the Spanish Women's League's table in the mid of the season. After several formats in previous years, the 2019 edition reverted to the Final Eight format.

CB Avenida is the defending champion and in 2019 won its eighth title,  surpassing both Ros Casares and Picadero JC as the most successful team in the competition.

List of winners

Winners by titles

See also
Liga Femenina
Supercopa de España

References

External links
Spanish Basketball Federation website
1943–62 finals
1963–82 finals

 
Recurring sporting events established in 1978
Basketball cup competitions in Spain
Women's basketball competitions in Spain
Women's basketball cup competitions in Europe